Broomhall is a civil parish in Cheshire East, England.  It contains five buildings that are recorded in the National Heritage List for England as designated listed buildings, all of which are at Grade II.  This grade is the lowest of the three gradings given to listed buildings and is applied to "buildings of national importance and special interest".  The parish is entirely rural, and three of the listed buildings are farmhouses.  The Shropshire Union Canal passes through the northeast part of the parish.  Two structures associated with the canal are listed, a bridge and a milepost.

See also
Listed buildings in Sound
Listed buildings in Baddington
Listed buildings in Newhall

References

Listed buildings in the Borough of Cheshire East
Lists of listed buildings in Cheshire